In aviation, to jettison is to discard fuel, external stores or other expendable items.  The item is usually jettisoned by operating a switch or handle; external stores may be separated from the aircraft by use of explosive bolts or a mechanism.

Fuel jettison
Fuel jettisoning or fuel dumping is an emergency procedure used by crews of to reduce an aircraft's weight in an emergency when the aircraft meet its maximum landing weight.

External stores jettison
Some military aircraft can carry weapons (for example bombs or rockets) and fuel tanks on external hardpoints. The pilot can jettison them if necessary, so they do not inhibit actions during combat or in an emergency. Airports may establish specific safe areas for the jettison of external stores, when required.

See also
Fuel dumping

References

Emergency aircraft operations